Brummer Badenhorst (born 6 September 1990) is a South African rugby union player, currently playing for . His usual position is prop.

Career

Youth

He was also a member of the South Africa Under-20 team at the 2010 IRB Junior World Championship.

Free State Cheetahs and Griquas

He then joined  for the 2013 season, making thirteen appearances.

UP Tuks

At the start of 2014, he followed former  coach Pote Human to Varsity Cup side .

References

1990 births
Living people
Free State Cheetahs players
Griquas (rugby union) players
Rugby union players from Durban
Rugby union props
South Africa Under-20 international rugby union players
South African people of Dutch descent
South African people of German descent
South African rugby union players